The European Taekwondo Championships are the European senior championships in Taekwondo, first held in Barcelona in 1976. The event is held every two years and is organized by the European Taekwondo Union, the continental affiliate of World Taekwondo, which organises and controls Olympic style taekwondo. An additional event, the G4 Extra European Taekwondo Championships were exceptionally held in 2019.

The championships should not be confused with:

 the European Games taekwondo competitions, which form part of a continental multi-sport event in the Olympic tradition;
 the EITF European Taekwondo Championships, a championships organised by the European International Taekwondo Federation, the continental arm of the International Taekwondo Federation.
the European Taekwondo Championships Olympic Weight Categories, also organised by the ETU but only a G-1 ranked tournament while the European Taekwondo Championships are ranked as a G-4 tournament and also the most important continental competition.

Editions

 2020 European Taekwondo Championships was cancelled due to COVID-19 pandemic ( Belgrade, Serbia).

Extra European Championships 

The G4 Extra European Taekwondo Championships were held in November 2019 as a form of compensation for European athletes to provide them the chance to collect ranking points for the 2020 Olympic Games after taekwondo was dropped from the 2019 European Games program. World Taekwondo Europe (WTE) president referred to it as the continental flagship event.

Team ranking 
Team Points Rules:

1976-2018: Each Registered (weight-in) player 1 Point + Each win 1 Point + Gold medal 7 point + silver medal 3 point + bronze medal 1 point

2021-Ongoing: Each Registered (weight-in) player 1 Point + Each win 1 Point + Gold medal 120 piont + silver medal 50 point + bronze medal 20 point

If the points are equal, the medals will choose the best team.

Medal summary 
All results from 1976 - 2022

Multiple gold medalists
The table shows those who have won at least three gold medals.

Men

Women

See also
European Taekwondo Championships Olympic Weight Categories
European Juniors Taekwondo Championships
European Universities Taekwondo Championships

References

External links 
 Official site of the European Taekwondo Union

 
Taekwondo competitions
Taekwondo
Taekwondo in Europe
Recurring sporting events established in 1976
Biennial sporting events